Christian Jørgensen Kruse (1636-1699) was a Norwegian government official.  He served as the County Governor of Nordland county from 1686 until 1691.

References

1636 births
1699 deaths
County governors of Norway
County governors of Nordland